Coney Lake is a small alpine lake located in the Enchantments region of the Alpine Lakes Wilderness in Chelan County, Washington. Coney Lake sits in a bowl formed by a rocky cliff bifurcation of the north skirt of Cannon Mountain that connects to Elf Ridge Peak. Coney Lake has an outflow that is a tributary of Rat Creek, a short distance north-east along Dragon Teeth Peaks. Shield Lake is situated over the opposite side over Elf Ridge.

See also
 List of lakes of the Alpine Lakes Wilderness

References

External links

Lakes of Chelan County, Washington
Lakes of the Alpine Lakes Wilderness
Okanogan National Forest